The Zaporozhian Sich (also , ; Free lands of the Zaporozhian Host the Lower) was a semi-autonomous polity and proto-state of Cossacks that existed between the 16th to 18th centuries, including as an autonomous stratocratic state within the Cossack Hetmanate for over a hundred years, centred around the region now home to the Kakhovka Reservoir and spanning the lower Dnieper river in Ukraine. In different periods the area came under the sovereignty of the Polish–Lithuanian Commonwealth, the Ottoman Empire, the Tsardom of Russia, and the Russian Empire.

In 1775, shortly after Russia annexed the territories ceded to it by the Ottoman Empire under the Treaty of Küçük Kaynarca (1774), Catherine the Great disbanded the Sich. She incorporated its territory into the Russian province of Novorossiya.

The term Zaporozhian Sich can also refer metonymically and informally to the whole military-administrative organisation of the Zaporozhian Cossack host.

Name 
The name "Zaporizhia" refers to the military and political organization of the Cossacks and to the location of their autonomous territory 'beyond the Rapids' of the Dnieper River. The Dnieper Rapids were a major portage on the north-south Dnieper trade route. The term sich is a noun related to the Eastern Slavic verb sich''' (сѣчь), meaning "to chop" or "cut"; it may have been associated with the usual wood sharp-spiked stockades around Cossack settlements.

Zaporizhia was located in the region around Kakhovka Reservoir in today's south-eastern Ukraine (much of its territory is now flooded by the reservoir). The area was also known under the historical term, Wild Fields.

 History 
A possible precursor of the Zaporozhian Sich was a fortification (sich) built on the Tomakivka island in the middle of the Dnieper River in the present-day Zaporizhzhia region of Ukraine. However, there is no direct evidence about the exact time of the existence of Tomakivska Sich, whereas indirect data suggest that at the time of Tomakivska Sich there was no Zaporozhian Sich yet.

The history of Zaporozhian Sich spans six time-periods:

 the emergence of the Sich (construction of ) (1471–1583)
 as part of the Lesser Poland Province of the Polish Crown by inclusion in the Kiev Voivodeship (1583–1657)
 the struggle against the Rzeczpospolita (the Polish-Lithuanian state), the Ottoman Empire, and the Crimea Khanate for the independence of the Ukrainian part of the Rzeczpospolita (Commonwealth) (1657–1686)
 the struggle with Crimea, the Ottoman Empire, and the Russian Empire for the unique identity of Cossacks (1686–1709)
 the standoff with the Russian government during its attempts to cancel the self-governing of the Sich, and its fall (1734–1775)
 the formation of the Danubian Sich outside the Russian Empire and finding ways to return home (1775–1828)

 Formation 

The Zaporozhian Sich emerged as a method of defence by Slavic colonists against the frequent and devastating raids of Crimean Tatars, who captured and enslaved hundreds of thousands of Ukrainians, Belorusians and Poles in operations called "the harvesting of the steppe". The Ukrainians created a self-defence force, the Cossacks, fierce enough to stop the Tatar hordes, and built fortified camps (sichi) that were later united to form a central fortress, the Zaporozhian Sich.

Prince Dmytro Vyshnevetsky established the first Zaporozhian Sich on the island of Small (Mala) Khortytsia in 1552, building a fortress at Niz Dnieprovsky (Lower Dnieper) and placing a Cossack garrison there; Tatar forces destroyed the fortress in 1558. The Tomakivka Sich was built on a now-inundated island to the south, near the modern city of Marhanets; Tatars also razed that sich, in 1593. A third sich soon followed, on Bazavluk island, which survived until 1638, when it was destroyed by a Polish expeditionary force suppressing a Cossack uprising. These settlements, founded during the 16th century, were already complex enough to constitute an early proto-state.

 Struggle for independence 

The Zaporozhian Cossacks became included in the Kiev Voivodeship from 1583 to 1657, part of the Lesser Poland Province of the Polish Crown. They resented Polish rule, however, one of the reasons being religious differences, as the cossacks were Orthodox Christians whereas the Poles were mostly Catholics. They thus engaged in a long struggle for independence from surrounding powers, the Rzeczpospolita (Polish state), the Ottoman Empire, the Crimean Khanate, and the Tsardom of Russia and Russian Empire. The Sich became the centre of Cossack life, governed by the Sich Rada alongside its Kosh Ataman (sometimes called Hetman, from German "Hauptmann").

In 1648, Bohdan Khmelnytsky captured a sich at Mykytyn Rih, near the present-day city of Nikopol. From there he began an uprising against the Polish–Lithuanian Commonwealth that led to the establishment of the Cossack Hetmanate (1649–1764). After the Treaty of Pereyaslav in 1654, the Zaporozhian Host was split into the Hetmanate, with its capital at Chyhyryn, and the more autonomous region of Zaporozhia, which continued to be centred on the Sich. During this period the Sich changed location several times. The Chortomlyk Sich was built at the mouth of the Chortomlyk River in 1652. In 1667 the Truce of Andrusovo made the Sich a condominium ruled jointly by Russia and the Polish–Lithuanian Commonwealth.

During the reign of Peter the Great, Cossacks were used for the construction of canals and fortification lines in northern Russia. An estimated 20–30 thousands were sent each year. Hard labour led to a high mortality rate among builders, and only an estimated 40% of Cossacks returned home.

After the Battle of Poltava in 1709, the Chortomlyk Sich (sometimes referred to as the "Old Sich" (Stara Sich)) was destroyed and Baturyn, the capital of Hetman Ivan Mazepa, was razed. Another sich was built at the mouth of the Kamianets river but was destroyed in 1711 by the Russian government. The Cossacks then fled to the Crimean Khanate to avoid persecution and founded the Oleshky Sich in 1711 (today the city of Oleshky). In 1734, they were allowed to return to the Russian Empire. Suffering from discrimination in the Khanate, Cossacks accepted the offer to return and built another Sich in close proximity to the former Chortomlyk Sich (referred to as the "New Sich"). The population in steppe region numbered around 52,000 in the year 1768.

Fear of the independence of the Sich resulted in the Russian administration abolishing the Hetmanate in 1764. The Cossack officer class was incorporated into the Imperial Russian nobility (Dvoryanstvo). The rank and file Cossacks, however, including a substantial portion of the old Zaporozhians, were reduced to peasant status. Tension rose after the Treaty of Küçük Kaynarca, when the need for a southern frontier ended after the annexation of the Crimea. The colonisation of Novorossiya (New Russia) with Serbian and Romanians sponsored by Russia created further conflict. After the end of the war between Russia and the Ottoman Empire for possession of the Black Sea and Crimean steppes, Russia no longer needed the Zaporozhian Cossacks for protection of the border region. Russia finally destroyed the Zaporozhian Sich through military force in 1775.

 Destruction and aftermath 

In May 1775, Russian General Peter Tekeli received orders to occupy and destroy the Zaporozhian Sich from Grigory Potemkin, who had been formally admitted into Cossackdom a few years earlier. Potemkin was given direct orders from Catherine the Great. On 5 June 1775, Tekeli surrounded the Sich with artillery and infantry. He postponed the assault and even allowed visits while the head of the Host, Petro Kalnyshevsky, was deciding how to react to the Russian ultimatum. The Zaporozhians decided to surrender. The Sich was officially disbanded by the 3 August 1775 manifesto of Catherine, "On the Liquidation of Zaporozhian Sich and Annexation thereof to Novorossiya Governorate", and the Sich was razed to the ground.

Some of the Cossack officer class, the starshyna, became hereditary Russian nobility and obtained huge lands in spite of their previous attempts to relocate the Sich to either North America or Australia. Under the guidance of a starshyna named Lyakh, a conspiracy was formed among a group of 50 Cossacks to pretend to go fishing on the river Inhul next to the Southern Buh in the Ottoman provinces, and to obtain 50 passports for the expedition. The pretext was enough to allow about 5,000 Zaporozhians to flee, some travelling to the Danube Delta where they formed a new Danube Sich, as a protectorate of the Ottoman Empire. Others moved to Hungary to form a Sich there as a protectorate of the Austrian Empire. According to folklore, some moved to Malta, because Kosh otamans and other senior members of the starshyna considered themselves a kind of Maltese chivalry.

The leader of the Zaporozhian Host, Petro Kalnyshevsky, was arrested and exiled to the Solovetsky Islands (where he lived to the age of 112 in the Solovetsky Monastery). Four high level starshynas were repressed and exiled, later dying in Siberian monasteries. Lower level starshynas who remained and went over to the Russian side were given army ranks and all the privileges that accompanied them, and allowed to join Hussar and Dragoon regiments. Most of the ordinary Cossacks were made peasants and even serfs.

In 1780, after disbanding the Zaporozhian Cossack Host, General Grigorii Potemkin attempted to gather and reorganize the Cossacks on a voluntary basis, and they helped to defend Ukraine from the Turks during the Russo-Turkish War (1787–1792). He was able to gather almost 12,000 Cossacks and called them the Black Sea Cossacks. After the conflict was over, rather than allowing the Cossacks to settle across Southern Ukraine, the Russian government began to resettle them on the Kuban River. In 1860, they changed their name to the Kuban Cossacks.

Ukrainian writer Adrian Kaschenko (1858–1921) and historian Olena Apanovich note that the abolition of the Zaporozhian Sich had a strong symbolic effect, and memories of the event remained for a long time in local folklore.

 Organization and government 

 
The Zaporozhian Host was led by the Sich Rada that elected a Kosh Otaman as the host's leader. He was aided by a head secretary (pysar), head judge, and head archivist. During military operations the Otaman carried unlimited power supported by his staff as the military collegiate. He decided with an agreement from the Rada whether to support a certain Hetman (such as Bohdan Khmelnytsky) or other leaders of state.

Some sources refer to the Zaporozhian Sich as a "Cossack republic", because the highest power in it belonged to the assembly of all its members, and its leaders (starshyna) were elected. The Cossacks formed a society (hromada) that consisted of "kurins" (each with several hundred Cossacks). A Cossack military court severely punished violence and stealing among compatriots, the bringing of women to the Sich, the consumption of alcohol in periods of conflict, and other offenses. The administration of the Sich provided Orthodox churches and schools for the religious and secular education of children.

The population of the Sich had a cosmopolitan component, including Ukrainians, Moldavians, Tatars, Poles, Lithuanians, Jews, Russians and many other ethnicities. The social structure was complex, consisting of destitute gentry and boyars, szlachta'' (Polish nobility), merchants, peasants, outlaws of every sort, runaway slaves from Turkish galleys, and runaway serfs (as the Zaporozhian polkovnyk Pivtorakozhukha). Some of those who were not accepted to the host formed gangs of their own, and also claimed to be Cossacks. However, after the Khmelnytsky Uprising these formations largely disappeared and were integrated mainly into Hetmanate society.

Army and warfare 
The Cossacks developed a large fleet of fast, light vessels. Their campaigns were targeted at rich settlements on the Black Sea shores of the Ottoman Empire, and several times took them as far as Constantinople and Trabzon (formerly Trebizond).

Zaporozhian Sich centers and locations
 Khortytsia Sich (1556–1557)
 Khortytsia Island (today, part of Zaporizhzhia)
 Tomakivka Sich (1564–1593)
 submerged (located near today's Marhanets)
 Bazavluk Sich, (1593–1638)
 submerged (located near today's village of Kapulivka, Nikopol Raion)
 Mykyta Sich (1639–1652)
 Nikopol
 Chortomlyk Sich (1652–1709)
 submerged (located near today's village of Kapulivka, Nikopol Raion)
 Kamyanka Sich (1709–1711)
 near village of Respublikanets, Beryslav Raion
 Oleshky Sich (1711–1734)
 eastern outskirts of the city of Oleshky
 Nova [Pidpilnenska] Sich (1734–1775)
 near village of Pokrovske, Nikopol Raion (about same location of Chortomlyk and Bazavluk)

Zaporozhian Siches and their leaders 

 Khortytsia Sich (1556–1557)
 Wężyk Chmielnicki (1534–1569)
 Tomakivka Sich (1564–1593)
 Wężyk Chmielnicki (1534–1569)
 Michał Wiśniowiecki (1529–1584) (1569–1570)
 Iwan Swiergowski (1574)
 Samiylo Kishka (1574–1575)
 Bohdan Ruzhynski (1575–1576)
 Jacub Szach (1576–1578)
 Ioan Potcoavă (1577–1578)
 Lukyan Chornynsky (1578)
 Jan Oryszowski (1581)
 Samuel Zborowski (1581–1584)
 Bohdan Mokoshynsky (1584)
 Mykhailo Ruzhynski (1585)
 Zakhar Kulaha (1585)
 Bohdan Mokoshynsky (1586)
 Lukyan Chornynsky (1586)
 Demyan Skalozub (1585–1589)
 Krzysztof Kosiński (−1593)
 Bazavluk Sich, (1593–1638)
 Hryhoriy Loboda (1593–1596)
 Bohdan Mokoshynsky (1594)
 Jan Oryszowski (1596)
 Severyn Nalyvaiko (1596)
 Khrystofor Netkovsky (1596–1597)
 Hnat Vasylevych (1596–1597)
 Tykhin Baybuza (1597–1598)
 Fedir Polous (1598)
 Semen Skalozub (1599)
 Samiylo Kishka (1600–1602)
 Havrylo Krutnevych (1602–1603)
 Ivan Kutskovych (1602–1603)
 Ivan Kosyi (1603)
 Kaletnyk Andriyevych (1609–1610)
 Olifer Holub (1622–1623)
 Mykhailo Doroshenko (1623–1625)
 Kaletnyk Andriyevych (1624–1625)
 Marek Zhmaylo (1625)
 Mykhailo Doroshenko (1625–1628)
 Hryhoriy Chorny (1628–1630)
 Ivan Sulyma (1628–1629)
 Lev Ivanovych (1629–1630)
 Taras Tryasylo (1630)
 Timothy Orendarenko (1630–1631)
 Semen Perevyazka (1632)
 Timothy Orendarenko (1632–1633)
 Ivan Petrizhitsky-Kulaga (1632)
 Andriy Didenko (1633)
 Dorothy Doroshenko (1633)
 Ivan Sulyma (1633–1635)
 Sava Kononovych (1637)
 Pavlo Pavlyuk (1637)
 Illyash Karayimovych (1638)
 Yakiv Ostryanyn (1638)
 Dmytro Hunia (1638)
 Mykytyn Sich (1639–1652)
 Karpo Pivtora-Kozhukha (1639–1642)
 Maksym Hulak (1642–1646)
 establishment of the Hetman of Zaporizhian Host
 Chortomlyk Sich (1652–1709)
 Kamyanka Sich (1709–1711)
 Oleshky Sich (1711–1734)
 Nova Podpolnenska Sich (1734–1775)
 Danubian Sich (1775–1828)

See also 
 History of the Cossacks
 Zaporozhian Cossacks
 Tatar invasions

References

Works cited

External links 
 Zaporozhian Sich – Encyclopedia of Ukraine

 
Fiefdoms of Poland
Early Modern history of Ukraine
History of the Cossacks in Ukraine
States and territories established in 1552
States and territories disestablished in 1775
Zaporozhian Cossacks
Zaporozhian Host